Mariah Buzolin Oliveira (born February 3, 1991) is a Brazilian actress. She is best known for her role as Maya Mercado in All My Children, and as Zoe Mendez in the ABC Family television series Jane by Design.

On or about May 30, 2018, Oliveira became engaged to former US Skier Jeremy Bloom. (Their proposal was posted on Instagram.) The couple has dated since January 2017 and lived together since May of that same year. They are building a home in Boulder, CO, and will make their home there later.
Oliveira was married Sunday November 11, 2018 in Keystone, CO.

Life and career
She was born in São Paulo, Brazil on February 3, 1991. She is the youngest child of two. Her parents named her Mariah Buzolin Oliviera but sometimes she credited as Mariah Moore in several films. At the age of six, she moved to Chicago with her family, where in less than three months she was fluent in the language. In 2003, her first professional opportunities began to appear when she won a fashion contest, competing against hundreds of other girls nationwide. She moved to Los Angeles in 2006 after getting the attention from several agents and agencies.
She began her acting career in 2007 when she played Sara in Fallout and also playing Mary in The Faithful alongside Aliens in the Attic star, Austin Butler. She also had appearance on the Nickelodeon series Zoey 101 as Brooke Margolin. In 2009, she playing Beth on the American children's comedy film, Hotel For Dogs alongside Emma Roberts and Jake T. Austin. She became known for her role as Angelina on the Disney Channel series, Jonas.

In 2012, she guest starred on the Nickelodeon show Hollywood Heights and played Zoe Mendez on Jane by Design.

Filmography

References

External links
 Official Blog
 

1991 births
Living people
Brazilian actresses